Rudkøbing Pharmacy has since its foundation in 1705 been located at Brogade 15 in Rudkøbing on the island of Langeland, Denmark. The current buildings were constructed in the 1850s and have been listed in the Danish registry of protected buildings and places. The former laboratory and a storage room on the first floor are operated as a museum under the name Det Gamle Apotek by Rudkøbing Museum.

History
The pharmacy at Brogade 15 was founded on 2 November 1705 by Christopher Becker. The founder's paternal uncle, Johann Gottfried Becker, was the owner of the Elephant Pharmacy on Købmagergade in Copenhagen.

A later owner was pharmacist Søren Christian Ørsted, the father of physicist Hans Christian Ørsted and jurist and politician Anders Sandøe Ørsted, who purchased the pharmacy in 1776.

The pharmacy was for three generations, between 1854 and 1973, owned by the Bauer family.

Prominent figures who have visited the pharmacy include Adam Oehlenschläger, Herman Bang, Johannes V. Jensen and Agnes and Poul Henningsen.

Buildings
The current Neoclassical building complex was constructed in 1856. It consists of a main wing towards the street and two side wings that project from the rear side of the building as well as a garden pavilion. The buildings surround a cobbled courtyard. The buildings were refurbished in the 1870s.

List of owners
 2.11.1705-xx.xx.1741  Gottfried Christopher Becker
 13.10.1741-xx.xx.1772  Andreas Jørgensen
 08.091773-xx.xx.1774   Hans Venninghausen
 xx.xx.1774-xx.xx.1776  Hans Holm
 05.06.1776-xx.xx.1806  Søren Christian Ørsted
 03.10.1806-xx.xx.1841  Anton Jacobæus
 02.10.1841-xx.xx.1854  Frederik Wengel
 21.12.1854-31.12.1888  August Fridolin Bauer
 14.02.1889-30.06.1925  Christian August Pilegaard Bauer
 29.06.1925-31.05.1973  Axel Bauer
 16.03.1973-30.04.1996  Per Ratlau Berg
 01.03.1996-               Hanne Mouritsen

References 

Pharmacies of Denmark
Listed buildings and structures in Langeland Municipality
Listed pharmacy buildings in Denmark
Buildings and structures completed in 1856
Danish companies established in 1705